James "Jem" Grundy (5 March 1824 in New Radford, Nottingham – 24 November 1873 in Carrington, Nottingham) was an English cricketer during the game's roundarm era.  He was one of the notable bowlers of the 1850s and was frequently among the leading wicket-takers.  He bowled right-arm fast roundarm and is known to have occasionally used fast underarm deliveries, but he is said to have varied his pace.  He batted right-handed and was an occasional wicket-keeper.

Grundy's known first-class career spanned the 1850 to 1869 seasons.  He took 1,137 wickets in 298 matches with a bowling average of 12.81 with a best analysis of 9/19.  He had 84 5-wicket innings and 24 10-wicket matches.  He scored 5,898 runs with the bat at an average of 12.65 with a highest score of 95.  He took 233 catches and made 2 stumpings.

In 1857, he became the first person to be given out handled the ball.

At the end of the 1859 English cricket season, Grundy was one of the 12 players who took part in cricket's first-ever overseas tour when an England cricket team led by George Parr visited North America.

References

External links
 cricketarchive

Further reading
 H S Altham, A History of Cricket, Volume 1 (to 1914), George Allen & Unwin, 1926
 Derek Birley, A Social History of English Cricket, Aurum, 1999
 Rowland Bowen, Cricket: A History of its Growth and Development, Eyre & Spottiswoode, 1970
 Arthur Haygarth, Scores & Biographies, Volumes 3–9 (1841–1866), Lillywhite, 1862–1867
 John Major, More Than A Game, HarperCollins, 2007 – includes the famous 1859 touring team photo taken on board ship at Liverpool

1824 births
1873 deaths
United All-England Eleven cricketers
English cricketers
English cricketers of 1826 to 1863
English cricketers of 1864 to 1889
Nottinghamshire cricketers
Marylebone Cricket Club cricketers
Players cricketers
North v South cricketers
Cricketers from Nottingham
Professionals of Marylebone Cricket Club cricketers
Marylebone Cricket Club and Metropolitan Clubs cricketers
North of the Thames v South of the Thames cricketers